Mary H. Wright Elementary School is a former school building in Spartanburg, South Carolina. It was constructed in 1951 as part of SC Governor James F. Byrnes's attempt to establish "separate but equal" facilities in order to avoid desegregation of schools. After integration, it continued to serve as an elementary school until 2001, when a new school of the same name was constructed nearby. The building served as a learning center and then a housing authority office over the next several years until it was left vacant in 2016. In 2022, it was renovated into Schoolhouse Lofts, a 53-unit apartment development.

It was named to the National Register of Historic Places on August 3, 2007.

References

External links 
 Spartanburg County School District No. 7
 

School buildings on the National Register of Historic Places in South Carolina
Public elementary schools in South Carolina
School buildings completed in 1951
African-American history of South Carolina
Buildings and structures in Spartanburg, South Carolina
National Register of Historic Places in Spartanburg, South Carolina